The 2014 Sporting Kansas City season was the nineteenth season of the team's existence in Major League Soccer and the fourth year played under the Sporting Kansas City moniker.

Sporting Kansas City entered the season in the 2013–14 CONCACAF Champions League championship stage for the first time in franchise history.

Sporting Kansas City also entered the season as the defending MLS Cup champion, after beating Real Salt Lake in PKs in the MLS Cup 2013.

Squad

First team roster 
As of August 17, 2014.

Player movement

In

Out

Loans

In

Out

Competitions

Match results

Preseason

Desert Friendlies

Walt Disney World Pro Soccer Classic 

Kickoff times are in CST (UTC-06) unless shown otherwise

Major League Soccer

League table

Eastern Conference standings

Regular season 

Kickoff times are in CDT (UTC-05) unless shown otherwise

MLS Cup Playoffs

Bracket

Results

CONCACAF Champions League

CONCACAF Champions League (2013–14) 

Advanced from Group Stage

Championship Stage 

In the championship stage, the eight teams play a single-elimination tournament. Each tie is played on a home-and-away two-legged basis. The away goals rule is used if the aggregate score is level after normal time of the second leg, but not after extra time, and so a tie is decided by penalty shoot-out if the aggregate score is level after extra time of the second leg.

Bracket

Quarterfinals 

|}

Cruz Azul won 5–2 on aggregate.

CONCACAF Champions League (2014–15)

Group stage

U.S. Open Cup

Friendlies

References 

Sporting Kansas City seasons
Sporting Kansas City
Sporting Kansas City
Sporting Kansas City